The Kremlin Regiment, also called the Presidential Regiment, is a unique military regiment and part of the Russian Federal Protective Service with the status of a special unit. The regiment ensures the security of the Kremlin, its treasures, and state officials. In accordance with the federal law of December 8, 1997 "On Immortalizing the Soviet People’s Victory in the Great Patriotic War of 1941–1945", the regiment also maintains a guard of honor at the eternal flame of the Tomb of the Unknown Soldier. The regiment is housed in the historic Kremlin Arsenal.

History

When the leaders of the Soviet Union moved from Petrograd to the Moscow Kremlin in early 1918, their protection was entrusted to the Red Latvian Riflemen, under the command of the Commandant of the Kremlin Garrison. In September 1918, the Latvian Riflemen left for the fronts of the Civil War, and they were replaced by the officer cadets of the 1st WPKA Soviet Joint Military School "All-Russian Central Executive Committee" that were redeployed into the Kremlin for this purpose. In 1924, they were assigned with the duty to guard Lenin's Mausoleum by orders of the ARCEC.

In October 1935, the officers' academy left the Kremlin for the Moscow district of Lefortovo and a Special Purpose Battalion was created to replace them on Kremlin and Mausoleum guard duties. On January 28, 1936, the battalion – and the Kremlin Garrison (Komendatura Kremlya), to which it was subordinated – were transferred from the People's Commissariat of Defense of the USSR to the People's Commissariat of Internal Affairs (NKVD) of the USSR. The UKMK and the 1st Division were separate public security units with neither subordinate to the other, which would not prevent them collaborating closely in Kremlin security activities.

On April 8, 1936, in accordance with Order No. 122 for the Moscow Kremlin Garrison, the Special Purpose Battalion became the Special Purpose Regiment; this day is considered the birthday of the regiment. However, the Regiment's Day is celebrated annually on May 7. Since in recent years the date has also been the day of Russian presidential inaugurations, the new President of Russia, following his oath-taking ceremony, receives the salute of the regiment on this day.

When the Great Patriotic War began in 1941, the units of the Kremlin Garrison were made responsible for defending the Kremlin, where the State Defense Committee and Chief Military Headquarters were located. On June 25, 1941, the Commandant of the Garrison ordered the regiment to reinforce the defenses, and the regiment set up round-the-clock guard on the Kremlin walls. In 1942–1943 four groups of snipers from the Kremlin Regiment were sent to the Western and Volkhov Fronts. The snipers killed more than 1,200 German soldiers and officers, losing only 97 men in combat. On February 23, 1944 the Kremlin Regiment was decorated with the Order of the Red Banner. Three battalions from the regiment took part in the Moscow Victory Parade of 1945 on Red Square.

In 1952 the regiment was reorganized into the Separate Special Purpose Regiment. On May 7, 1965 it was decorated with the Order of the Red Banner for its military achievements during the Great Patriotic War. On May 8, 1967 the regiment took part in the unveiling ceremony of the Tomb of the Unknown Soldier in the Alexander Garden. In 1973 the unit was renamed the Separate Red Banner Kremlin Regiment, later receiving an Order of the October Revolution. Before being deprived of Mausoleum guard duties in 1993 as a result of the collapse of the Soviet Union and the constitutional crisis of that year, the regiment finally received its current designation in accordance with a presidential decree of March 20 that year, this time under the Federal Protective Service. Since 1997 the Kremlin Regiment has resumed guard duties by presidential decree on the Tomb of the Unknown Soldier and its Eternal Flame, keeping alive the legacy of those who served on the Eastern Front.

On September 2, 2002 on the basis of the 11th Cavalry Regiment (the Moscow Military District movie-making cavalry unit) a cavalry escort unit was formed as part of the Presidential Regiment. Starting in 2004 a Guard Mounting ceremony has been held on Cathedral Square on Sundays, from March to October.

On May 7, 2006 the regiment gained a new regimental color modeled on the ones used by the Imperial Guard units. It has also recently acquired special ceremonial uniforms closely modeled on those worn on parade by the infantry and the cavalry of the Russian Imperial Guard until 1914. These are worn in addition to modern style dress uniforms adapted from those utilised during the Soviet period. The historical uniform is in the historical wave-green colouring with cornflower blue piping & facings, whereas the modern dress uniform is a navy blue with cornflower blue piping. The historical dress uniform is a closed-collar tunic with a cornflower blue plastron, whereas the modern dress uniform is an open-collar jacket with a white dress shirt and tie. Shoulder boards are entirely ceremonial for both uniforms, both in entirely different designs, despite the ranks of the troops being the same between each. For both, only officers have ranks displayed. When in modern dress uniforms, soldiers wear peaked caps with a Soviet-style wreathed cockade. For historical dress, troops wear shakos with a sunburst Imperial eagle emblem. In historical dress, enlisted soldiers wear white belts & officers wear silver sash belts. In modern dress, all soldiers wear golden aigulettes and golden belts. In historical dress, gorgets are reflective of imperial officer insignia, whereas in modern dress, these are reflective of the Soviet general insignia. For both, white gloves, tall jackboots are worn and either SKS rifles or sabres are carried. During winter, double-breasted greatcoats are worn, these are gray for the historical dress uniform & navy blue for the modern dress uniform. The Regiment's Presidential Band wears white uniforms similar to those by the Imperial Guard bands of the late 19th century. The regiments casual dress is navy blue & features either a peaked cap or cornflower blue beret.

Uniforms based on the ones used by the infantry of the Regiment during the Second World War were worn for the first time by a platoon from the 1st Honor Guard Company during the 2015 Spasskaya Tower Military Music Festival and Tattoo.

On April 16, 2016, the Guard Mounting that day featured the first woman officer to serve in the Cavalry Squadron, the first time this had happened in a guard changing ceremony. This was also the first to be live streamed online.

Notable servicemen of Kremlin Regiment
 Mikhail Kasyanov, former Prime Minister of Russia
 Alexander Korzhakov, former head of the Federal Protective Service of Russia
 Andrei Lugovoi, deputy of the State Duma who was later indicted by UK authorities on charges of murdering Alexander Litvinenko.

Component units

 Regiment HQ
 Presidential Band of the Kremlin Regiment
 1st Battalion, Kremlin Regiment
 2nd Company
 3rd Company
 4th Company
 5th Company
 2nd Battalion, Kremlin Regiment
 6th Company
 7th Company
 8th Company
 9th Company
 3rd Battalion, Kremlin Regiment
 1st Honor Guard Company
 11th Honor Guard Company
 Automotive Company
 Presidential Cavalry Escort Battalion, Kremlin Regiment (former 11th Cavalry Regiment)
 10th Company
 12th Company
 1st Cavalry Squadron
 2nd Cavalry Squadron
 Support Squadron
 4th Operational Reserve Battalion, Kremlin Regiment
 Operational Reserve Company
 Protection Company

Band 
The Presidential Band of the Russian Federation serves as the official military band for the President of Russia, playing at official ceremonies and receptions for high-ranking officials. it is affiliated with the Military Band Service of the Armed Forces of Russia.

Ceremonial cavalry 
The cavalry escort takes part in the Russian presidential inauguration, as well as the Moscow Victory Day Parade on Red Square. Historically, it has taken part in processions on 7 November, specifically in 1941, 1967 and 1987. In certain parades, it is the only unit to represent the FSO on parade. Since 2005 the Cavalry Escort Squadron wears, on select occasions, dress and service uniforms worn by the cavalry units of the Red Army and the NKVD. In addition, since 2004, the cavalry has been participating in the changing of the guard on Cathedral Square and annually performs a demonstration program at the races for the President's Prize.

Gallery

See also
 154th Preobrazhensky Independent Commandant's Regiment
 Semyonovsky Life Guards Regiment
 Awards of the Federal Protective Service of the Russian Federation
 Federal Protective Service of Russia
 Federal Security Service of Russia
 Ninth Chief Directorate

References

External links
 
 Presidential Regiment – archive.kremlin.ru
 Regimental association website
 Kremlin Guards Don Spacesuits In Battle Against Winter Weather

Regiments of the Russian Federation
Regiments of the Soviet Union
Military units and formations of the NKVD
Guards regiments
Military units and formations established in 1936
Moscow Kremlin
Protective security units
Russian ceremonial units